The Morocco men's national water polo team is the representative for Morocco in international men's water polo.

Results

FINA World League
 2008 — Preliminary round

References

Water polo
Men's national water polo teams
National water polo teams in Africa
National water polo teams by country
 
Men's sport in Morocco